Escape Studios is a visual effects academy situated in High Holborn, London, offering short courses and degrees at undergraduate and postgraduate level. A subsidiary of Pearson College London since 2013, Escape Studios' primary offering includes study programmes in Visual Effects (VFX), Game Art and Animation, with short courses available in Motion Graphics. Pearson College London is part of Pearson plc, and is the only FTSE 100 company in the UK to design and deliver degrees. Since the foundation of Escape Studios in 2002, more than 4,000 students have passed through its doors, moving into jobs in the animation and visual effects industries.

History 
Escape Studios was founded in April 2002 by Dominic Davenport & Garrett Honn as an independent visual effects academy; initially based in Notting Hill, and later in Shepherd's Bush, London, offering short courses in Visual Effects (VFX), Game Art, Animation and later Motion Graphics. The goal was to become "Europe's top VFX school". In 2010 Davenport described Escape Studios as a "finishing school for the visual effects industry in this country", often taking students with an existing undergraduate degree and helping them to break into the industry.

In 2011 general manager Mark Cass explained in an interview with the BBC that demand for trained VFX talent was such that "we literally cannot train people quick enough to get out the door", and that the philosophy of Escape Studios is "recreate, as far as possible, the work environment that its graduates will hopefully enter".

In 2012 Escape Studios attempted to break into the United States setting up a training campus in LA but closed shortly after. Shortly after Escape Studios closed operations in LA it spun off its software re-selling business, creating a new company, Escape Technology, "targeting the media industry", allowing Escape Studios to "concentrate fully on the continued growth of its classroom and online academies and recruitment services".

Acquisition by Pearson

In October 2013 Escape Studios was acquired by Pearson plc, and from September 2015 it began offering degrees at graduate level (followed by undergraduate degrees from 2016) as a subsidiary of Pearson College London. Undergraduate and graduate degrees are validated and awarded by the University of Kent.

Pearson announced that "Escape Studios will retain its name and Shepherd’s Bush location", and promised a “smooth transition” for "all existing students and staff". Escape Studios' primary offerings are in three areas: Visual Effects (VFX), Animation and Game Art, although short courses are available in Motion Graphics.

Tutors include Head of Animation Alexander Williams. Visiting tutors include animator and graphic novelist Sydney Padua.

Industry Partnerships
Industry partners include Framestore, The Mill, MPC, Electric Theatre Collective, Jellyfish Pictures, Bluebolt, Cinesite, DNEG and Milk. In 2012 Escape Studios launched the first VFX Festival in London, in partnership with MPC, Framestore and Cinesite.

Escape Studios participates in the National Saturday Club, an outreach program that aims to help students from diverse backgrounds gain access to the creative industries. It also co-operates with ScreenSkills to offer courses aimed at under-represented groups such as women and minorities.

In January 2019 Escape Studios announced a Master's Degree in storyboarding and previsualisation, the first of its kind.

Awards

Students from Escape Studios have won a number of awards. The short film Home Sweet Home, directed by Maria Robertson, won Best Student Animation at the 2019 British Animation Film Festival. The short film Jericho was short-listed for a student BAFTA in 2019.

References
The British film and television industries: Decline or Opportunity? Published by The Stationery Office, 24 January 2010. Retrieved 5 December 2018

Notes

Visual effects companies
Animation schools in the United Kingdom
Entertainment companies established in 2002